Yeshiva Torah Vodaas (or Yeshiva and Mesivta Torah Vodaath or Yeshiva Torah Vodaath or  Torah Vodaath Rabbinical Seminary ) is a yeshiva in the Kensington neighborhood of Brooklyn, New York.

History 
The yeshiva was conceived in 1917 and formally opened in 1918, by friends Binyomin Wilhelm and Louis Dershowitz, to provide a yeshiva education centering on traditional Jewish sacred texts to the children of families then moving from the Lower East Side to the Williamsburg section of Brooklyn. From the diary of Binyomin Wilhelm (as cited by his great-grandson, Rabbi Zvi Belsky), Louis Dershowitz is credited, not only with giving early financial and moral support for the founding of the yeshiva,  but for the very idea of establishing a yeshiva in Williamsburg. The two friends contacted prominent local Rabbi Zev Gold of Congregation Beth Jacob Anshe Sholom and together they formed a board and established the yeshiva on Keap Street in Williamsburg as an elementary school. The yeshiva later moved to a new building at 206 Wilson Street and remained there until 1967, (The elementary school remained at 206 Wilson St. Until 1974) when it moved to its current location at 452 and 425 East 9th Street, Brooklyn, NY 11218. Gold was elected as the Yeshiva's first president and suggested the name of the school (which in its English rendering is, Yeshiva Torah Vodaath), after the yeshiva founded in Lida in 1905 by Rabbi Yitzchak Yaacov Reines, which combined secular studies with Jewish studies and traditional Talmud study. During this first period in the yeshiva's history,  the yeshiva was modeled after those in Europe, with religious studies in Yiddish and Talmud taught in the Hungarian style of the European yeshivas.

The founding members of the yeshiva soon offered the principalship of the institution to Rabbi Shraga Feivel Mendlowitz, who headed the yeshiva from 1922 to 1948. Under Mendlowitz's leadership, a mesivta (yeshiva high school) was opened in 1926. Later he opened a yeshiva gedola as well. Rabbi Dovid Leibovitz, a notable torah scholar from Europe was brought in to head the yeshiva's beit midrash (study hall) in 1929 but left after only four years to start his own yeshiva (Yeshivas Chofetz Chaim) after personal conflicts with Mendlowitz. Two years later, in 1935, Rabbi Shlomo Heiman became rosh yeshiva (head of the yeshiva), a position he held until his death in 1944.

When Mendlowitz died in 1948, he entrusted the yeshiva to Rabbi Yaakov Kamenetzky and Rabbi Reuven Grozovsky as roshei yeshiva, Rabbi Alexander Linchner as the financial head and secular studies principal, Rabbi Gedalia Schorr as menahel of the yeshiva, and Rabbi Nesanel Quinn as the principal of the high school.

The yeshiva has since expanded to include a beit midrash in Monsey, an elementary school division in nearby Marine Park, and two summer camps all serving a student body, from nursery to postgraduate kollel, that numbers nearly 2,000 students.

Philosophy 

"Torah im Derech Eretz" historically influenced the yeshiva's philosophy, but today it is strongly influenced by the Haredi philosophy. However, Torah Vodaath is one of the many major haredi yeshivas that allow its students to attend college while studying at the yeshiva. The great majority of the yeshiva's graduates go on to work in fields that are not related to the Torah education that they received in yeshiva. 
The Yeshiva was founded on a chassidic flavor that is everlasting. The Yeshiva also does not say Tachnun on Yud Tes Kislev, a major Chassidic holiday. </ref> מנהגי ישיבה תורה ודעת יו"ל ע"י ישיבה ומתיבתא תורה ודעת שנת תשע"ח </ref>

Roshei Yeshiva 

The current three roshei yeshiva are the following: Rabbi Yisroel Reisman,  Rabbi Yosef Savitsky, and Rabbi Yitzchok Lichtenstein.

Lichtenstein is a student of Rabbi Meshulum Dovid Soloveitchik, son of Rabbi Aharon Lichtenstein, grandson of Rabbi Joseph B. Soloveitchik, and rabbi of Kehillas Bais Avrohom in Monsey, NY.

Savitsky is a student of Rabbi Berel Soloveitchik and  Rabbi Aharon Kotler.

Reisman is rabbi of Agudath Israel of Madison and author of several books, including The Laws Of Ribbis and Pathways of the Prophets.

The previous roshei yeshiva include Rabbis  Shraga Feivel Mendlowitz, Yisroel Belsky, Avraham Yaakov Pam, Shlomo Heiman, Dovid Leibowitz, Yaakov Kamenetsky, Shachne Zohn, Zelik Epstein, Gedalia Schorr, Elya Chazan, Reuvain Fein, Simcha Sheps, Moshe Rosen (Nezer HaKodesh), and Reuvain Grozovsky.

Notable alumni 
Milton Balkany, Republican political activist and fundraiser
Professor Joseph M. Baumgarten, Dead Sea Scrolls scholar
Rabbi Saul Berman, American scholar and Modern Orthodox rabbi
Rabbi Professor Benjamin Blech, Professor of Talmud at Yeshiva University 
Rabbi J. David Bleich, Rosh Yeshiva in Rabbi Isaac Elchanan Theological Seminary of Yeshiva University
Rabbi Shlomo Carlebach, composer, singer, spiritual leader,  pioneer of the Baal teshuva movement
Noach Dear (1953–2020), New York Supreme Court Judge
Rabbi Zvi Dershowitz, Conservative rabbi
David G. Greenfield, politician and Chair of New York City Council's Land Use Committee from 2013-2017
Rabbi Moshe Heinemann, Rabbinical Supervisor , Star-K and Rav of Agudas Yisroel of Baltimore
Rabbi Levi Yitzchak Horowitz, the Bostoner Rebbe
 Rabbi Yakov Horowitz, educator and child safety advocate
Rabbi Shmuel Kamenetsky, Rosh Yeshiva of the Talmudical Yeshiva of Philadelphia
Rabbi Aryeh Kaplan, rabbi, Jewish thinker and author of over 40 works.
Rabbi Sholom Klass, rabbi, publisher of The Jewish Press
Professor David Kranzler historian of Rescue by Jews during the Holocaust
Rabbi Dr. Norman Lamm, rabbi, chancellor of Yeshiva University
Rabbi Bernard Levy, rabbi, head of OK Labs
Rabbi Yerucham Olshin, a Rosh Yeshiva of Beth Medrash Govoha, Lakewood, New Jersey
Rabbi Avraham Yaakov Pam, later Rosh Yeshiva of the Yeshiva (see above)
Rabbi Nesanel Quinn, later Menahel of the Yeshiva
Rabbi Yisroel Reisman, today Rosh Yeshiva of the Yeshiva, and Rabbi of Agudath Yisroel of Madison
Rabbi Sholom Rivkin, chief rabbi of St. Louis, Missouri
Rabbi Zvi Aryeh Rosenfeld, Polish–American rabbi and educator associated with the Breslov Hasidic movement
Rabbi Yitzchok Scheiner, Rosh Yeshiva of the Kamenitz yeshiva of Jerusalem 
Ben Zion Shenker, renowned Hasidic composer and hazzan
Rabbi Nosson Scherman, rabbi, owner and general editor of Artscroll
Rabbi Gedalia Schorr, later Rosh Yeshiva of the Yeshiva (see above)
Gene Simmons (Chaim Witz), aka The Demon, co-founder of the rock band KISS
Rabbi Elya Svei, Rosh Yeshiva of the Talmudical Yeshiva of Philadelphia
Rabbi Yaakov Weinberg, Rosh Yeshiva of Yeshivas Ner Yisroel
Rabbi Dr. Ephraim Wolf, recruited for the Yeshiva, founding Rabbi of the Great Neck Synagogue and the North Shore Hebrew Academy

References

External links 
 Official website

Educational institutions established in 1917
Jewish seminaries
Mesivtas
Torah Vodaas
1917 establishments in New York (state)